Bahram Beyk (also Romanized as Bahrām Beyk; also known as Bahrām Beyg, Bairambai, Bayrambey, and Bayrām Beyk) is a village in Qareh Poshtelu-e Bala Rural District, Qareh Poshtelu District, Zanjan County, Zanjan Province, Iran. At the 2006 census, its population was 469, in 102 families.

References 

Populated places in Zanjan County